Black Friday Sale is a website where online vendors in Germany, Austria and Switzerland list discounts they offer on "Black Friday". It was launched  in 2013, and the discounts were available for 24 hours on 28 November. The website reported that more than 1.2 million people had visited them on that day, making it the largest online shopping event in German speaking countries. The large number of visitors caused server overloads and lag. The overwhelming numbers of visitors also caused the servers of several online shops, such as the electronics store Saturn, to suffer significant downtime. Despite the technical problems, the first Black Friday Sale generated a significant turnover and was considered a success. The Black Friday word mark is protected in Germany. The owner is the Chinese company Super Union Holdings Limited. Black Friday GmbH is the exclusive licensee of the word mark in Germany.

References

External links
  

Annual events
Recurring events established in 2013
Sales and clearances